Gary Lazarus (born 21 September 1945) is a former Australian rules footballer who played with Fitzroy in the VFL during the 1960s.

Football

Fitzroy (VFL)
Lazarus came to Fitzroy straight from the thirds, without playing a single reserves game. He was used by Fitzroy mainly as a key forward and in the ruck. On four occasions, 1963, 1965, 1966 and 1967 he topped Fitzroy's goalkicking. He kicked a career high 39 goals in the 1966 season.

On 6 July 1963, playing at full-forward,and kicking four goals, he was a member of the young and inexperienced Fitzroy team that comprehensively and unexpectedly defeated Geelong, 9.13 (67) to 3.13 (31) in the 1963 Miracle Match.

See also
 1963 Miracle Match

References
 Holmesby, Russell and Main, Jim (2007). The Encyclopedia of AFL Footballers. 7th ed. Melbourne: Bas Publishing.

External links

1945 births
Australian rules footballers from Victoria (Australia)
Fitzroy Football Club players
Living people